Bokun is a Slavic surname.

It may refer to:

Branko Bokun (1920–2011), Croatian-English author
German Bokun (1922–1978), Belarusian-Soviet Olympic fencer
Bokkun, a character from the anime series Sonic X

See also 
 Bōkun Habanero, a Japanese snackfood

References

Slavic-language surnames
Belarusian-language surnames
Croatian surnames